The African Men's Olympic Qualifiers was held to determine the tree African national teams for under 23 that will participate at the 1996 Summer Olympics football tournament held in Atlanta.

Preliminary round

|}

Burundi advance. Djibouti withdrew.

Namibia won 3–1 on aggregate.

Burkina Faso advance. Djibouti withdrew.

First round

Group 1

|}

Group 2

|}

Group 3

|}

Second round

Group 1

|}

Group 2

|}

 Togo won 3–2 on aggragate, however it was later suspended because of age limit violation, Tunisia advanced to the third round.

Group 3

|}

Third round

|}

Tunisia won 5–4 on aggregate and qualified for the 1996 Summer Olympics.

Nigeria won 2–0 on aggregate and qualified for the 1996 Summer Olympics.

Ghana won 3–0 on aggregate and qualified for the 1996 Summer Olympics.

References 

Football qualification for the 1996 Summer Olympics
Football at the Summer Olympics – Men's African Qualifiers